The 2008 FIFA Futsal World Cup was the sixth edition of the FIFA Futsal World Cup, the quadrennial international futsal championship contested by the men's national teams of the member associations of FIFA. It was the first tournament to use the term "World Cup". It was held between 30 September and 19 October 2008 in Brazil. It was the only Futsal World Cup to feature 20 teams.

Brazil won the tournament for the fourth time. It was their first title since 1996.

Qualifying criteria

Qualified nations

Venues

Squads

Each nation submitted a squad of 14 players, including two goalkeepers.

Officials

First round

Draw
The 20 teams were divided in four groups, each group with five teams. The draw was held on 10 July 2008 in Brasília, Brazil

Tie break rule
In case two or more teams are equal on points, their ranking is determined by the results of matches between the tied teams only. If there is still a tie after this, the ranking is determined by goals difference in all group matches.

Group A

Group B

Group C

Group D

Second round

Group E

Group F

Final round

Semi-finals

Third place match

Final

Champions

Awards

Top goalscorers

The top 10 scorers from the 2008 FIFA Futsal World Cup are as follows:

Final tournament rankings
Per statistical convention in football, matches decided in extra time are counted as wins and losses, while matches decided by penalty shoot-out are counted as draws.

References

External links
FIFA Futsal World Cup Brazil 2008, FIFA.com
FIFA Technical Report

 
FIFA Futsal World Cup
F
F
International futsal competitions hosted by Brazil